Josephine Bell, pseudonym of Doris Bell Collier, (8 December 1897 – 24 April 1987), was an English physician and writer. Bell wrote nineteen novels and forty-five mystery novels in her lifetime, as well as radio plays, short stories, and series for women's magazines.

Life
Bell was born in Manchester, England in 1897 and studied at Godolphin School between 1910 and 1916. She then trained at Newnham College, Cambridge until 1919. At the University College Hospital in London she was granted M.R.C.S. and L.R.C.P. in 1922, and a M.B. B.S. in 1924.

In 1923, she married Dr. Norman Dyer Ball, and the couple had a son and three daughters. From 1927 until 1935 the couple practiced medicine in Greenwich and London. When her husband died, Bell moved to Guildford, Surrey. From 1954 through 1962 she was a member of the management committee of St. Luke's Hospital.

Bell began to write detective novels beginning in 1936 under her pen name. Many of her works used a medical background and featured the fictional character Dr. David Wintringham, who worked at Research Hospital in London as a junior assistant physician.

In 1953, Bell helped found the Crime Writers' Association and served as chair from 1959 to 1960.

Bibliography

David Wintringham

Murder in Hospital, 1937 
Death on the Borough Council, 1937 
Fall Over Cliff, 1938 
Death at Half-Term, 1939 
From Natural Causes, 1939 
All Is Vanity, 1940 
Death at the Medical Board, 1944 
Death in Clairvoyance, 1949 
The Summer School Mystery, 1950 
Bones in the Barrow, 1953 
The China Roundabout, 1956 
The Seeing Eye, 1958

Other crime novels

The Port of London Murders, 1938. 
Trouble at Wrekin Farm, 1942. 
Backing Winds, 1951. Serialised: Woman, as 'The Dark Tide' from 21 July to 18 August 1951
To Let, Furnished, 1952. 
Fires at Fairlawn, 1954. 
Death in Retirement, 1956. 
Double Doom, 1957. 
Easy Prey, 1959. 
The House Above the River, 1959. 
A Well-Known Face, 1960.
New People at the Hollies, 1961. 
Adventure with Crime, 1962. 
A Flat Tyre in Fulham, 1963.
The Hunter and the Trapped, 1963. 
The Alien, 1964. 
The Upfold Witch, 1964. Serialised: Woman's Realm from 15 August to 26 September 1964
No Escape, 1965. 
The Catalyst, 1966. 
Death on the Reserve, 1966. 
Death of a Con Man, 1968. 
The Fennister Affair, 1969. 
The Wilberforce Legacy, 1969. 
A Hydra with Six Heads, 1970. 
A Hole in the Ground, 1971. 
Death of a Poison-Tongue, 1972. 
A Pigeon Among the Cats, 1974. 
Victim, 1975. 
The Trouble in Hunter Ward, 1976. 
Such a Nice Client, 1977. 
A Swan-Song Betrayed, 1978. 
Wolf! Wolf!, 1979. 
A Question of Inheritance, 1980. 
The Innocent, 1983.

Other books

References

External links
 Josephine Bell 1897-1987, Crime & Mystery Fiction.
 Josephine Bell, Detective-Fiction.com.
 History of the CWA.

1897 births
1987 deaths
English crime fiction writers
20th-century English medical doctors
Alumni of Newnham College, Cambridge
Women mystery writers
20th-century English novelists
20th-century British women writers
Members of the Detection Club